Baeckea pygmaea is a species of flowering plant in the family Myrtaceae and is endemic to the south-west of Western Australia. It is a slender and erect or spreading shrub with narrowly egg-shaped to almost linear leaves and small white flowers with 12 to 25 stamens.

Description

Taxonomy
Baeckea pygmaea was first formally described in 1867 by George Bentham in Flora Australiensis from an unpublished manuscript by Robert Brown who collected the type specimens from King George Sound. The specific epithet (pygmaea) means "dwarf".

In 2021, Barbara Lynette Rye changed the name to Austrobaeckea pygmaea, but the name has not yet been accepted by the Australian Plant Census.

Distribution and habitat
This baeckea is found on flats and winter-wet swamps, from near Lake Muir to near Albany in the Jarrah Forest and Warren biogeographic regions of south-western Western Australia.

Conservation status
Baeckea pygmaea is listed as "not threatened" by the Government of Western Australia Department of Biodiversity, Conservation and Attractions.

See also
List of Baeckea species

References

Flora of Western Australia
pygmaea
Plants described in 1867
Taxa named by George Bentham